Providence Hospital was a hospital in Wallace, Idaho, United States, opened in 1891. It was established by the Sisters of Providence, a Roman Catholic order of nuns from Montreal, and part of the Providence Hospital System. It closed in 1968 due to aging facilities.

The hospital survived a 1910 fire that severely damaged the city of Wallace. A statue of  Jesus of the Sacred Heart, which sat in the first-story window of the hospital, has been missing for several decades as of 2011.

References

External links

Hospital photos at the Providence Archive

1891 establishments in Idaho
Defunct hospitals in the United States
Providence Health & Services